Pendency of court cases in India is the delay in the disposal of cases (lawsuits) to provide justice to the aggrieved person or organisation by judicial courts at all levels. The judiciary in India works in hierarchy at three levels - federal or supreme court, state or high courts, and district courts. The court cases is categorised into two types - civil and criminal. In 2022, the total number of pending cases of all types and at all levels rose to 50 million or 5 crores, including over 169,000 court cases pending for more than 30 years in district and high courts. 4.3 crore out of 5 crore cases, i.e more than 85% cases, are pending in district courts as of December 2022. Government itself is the biggest litigant, having 50% of the pending cases being sponsored by the state.

India has the largest number of pending court cases in the world. Many judges and government officials have said that the pendency of cases is the biggest challenge before Indian judiciary. According to a 2018 Niti Aayog strategy paper, at the then-prevailing rate of disposal of cases in our courts, it would take more than 324 years to clear the backlog. At that time in 2018, the pending cases stood at 29 million. With the cases taking time in courts, it leads to delays in the delivery of justice for both victim and accused. In April 2022, a court in Bihar state acquitted a man of murder for lack of evidence after he spent 28 years in jail. He was arrested at age 28, was freed at 58.

Pendency of cases cost 1.5%-2% of India's GDP.

Causes of pendency

Low strength of judges and non-judicial staff 
In 2022, the sanctioned strength of judges in India was 21.03 judges per million population. The absolute sanctioned strength of judges were 34 in Supreme Court, 1108 in high courts, and 24,631 in district courts. Law commission of India and Justice V S Malimath Committee had recommended in the past to raise the strength of judges to 50 judges per million population.

The sanctioned strength of judges of the Supreme Court of India can be increased by the Parliament passing a law. The sanctioned strength of judges of a High Court can be increased by the High Court making a recommendation and after it has been approved by the respective state government, its governor, the Chief Justice of India and the union government.

Vacant position of the judges 
Despite sanctioned strength of judges, courts in India have often not worked in full capacity due to vacancy of judges. In 2022, the working strength of judges in India was 14.4 judges per million population. It has changed marginally from 13.2 in 2016. In comparison, the strength of judges are 210 judges per million in Europe and 150 in the United States. Non-judicial staff positions also remain vacant with some states having vacancy upto 25% in 2018-19.

Vacancies in courts keep on arising periodically due to retirement, resignation, demise, or elevation of judges. The appointment of judges is a long process. Supreme Court judges are recommended for appointment by the Supreme Court collegium, consisting of the Chief Justice of India and the four remaining senior-most judges of the Supreme court. The names have to be approved by the union government before being appointed by the President.

The high court judges are recommended for appointment by the High Court collegium consisting of the Chief Justice of the High Court, and two remaining senior-most judges of the high court. The names have to be approved by the state government, the governor, the Chief Justice of India, and the union government before being appointed by the President.

The union government and the state government are binding to abide by the suggestion of the Chief Justice of India, the Chief Justice of the High court and their collegium in the appointment of the judges. However, the rule is seldom followed in time and the union government would delay the appointment or return the names for appointment. As per rule, the union government must approve the appointments in 3–4 weeks if the collegium reiterates the names.

The lack of coordination and cooperation is a major cause for the vacancy in the higher judiciary. In some cases, the appointment of judges has been delayed for 4 years due to the names pending with the union government for approval.

The district or lower court judge appointments in a state are made by the respective high court, the governor, and the State Public Service Commission. The exams are conducted for the appointment of the district judges and the civil judges. The examination for the civil judges appointment is conducted by the State Public Service Commission in 10 states only; while all other examination for the judge's appointment in a state jurisdiction is conducted by the High Court themselves. The examination and appointment process are not efficient. In 2018, Supreme Court noted that there was a mismatch in the number of posts vacant in the lower courts and the recruitment underway. In 2022, Bihar Public Service Commission took 30 months just to complete the examination. The union government has proposed setting up AIJS (All India Judicial Service) to tackle vacancies in the lower judiciary by centralising the recruitment process.

Lower judiciary suffers also from not attracting and retaining talented judges, and lack of career progression. Many judges have been quitting the judiciary to go into private practice or join top private law firms, as it offers a lot more in terms of remuneration. Many states have been criticised for the pay offered to lower court judges. Recommendations of the Judicial Pay Commission and the Supreme Court orders to increase the judges salary are not implemented by the states. In Delhi Judiciary exam 2019, 66 percent seats could not be filled as candidates were simply unable to score even the cut off marks. In Jammu and Kashmir judiciary exam 2019, not one candidate passed the district judge exam for the fourth consecutive time. In Tamil Nadu judiciary exam 2019, of around 3,500 lawyers appearing for the district judge examination, none passed.

Inadequate funding 
Except the Supreme Court which is funded by the central government, all the expenses of the High Court and the District Courts in a state are funded by the respective state government. As of 2018, 92% of all expenditure on the judiciary was borne by the states. This includes salary of judges, non-judicial staff and all operation costs. In 2019, India spent 0.08% of its GDP on the judiciary. All states and union territories allocated less than 1% of its annual budget on the judiciary, except Delhi with 1.9%. There is no guideline for the state expenditure on the judiciary to ensure higher efficiency of the judiciary.

In comparison, United States spends 2% of its annual budget on judiciary.

Lack of infrastructure 
District or lower courts are prone to lack of infrastructure. In 2022, there were only 20,143 court halls and 17,800 residential units for judicial officers available to use against the sanctioned strength of 24,631 lower court judges. Only 40% of the lower court buildings have fully functional toilets with some having no provisions for regular cleaning. Lower courts also suffer from the lack of digital infrastructure, video conferencing rooms, and video connectivity to jails and officers. Development of the infrastructure facilities for judiciary rests with the State Governments. In 2021, Chief Justice N V Ramana had proposed to set up NJIAI (National Judicial Infrastructure Authority of India) to perform administrative work of the judiciary including infrastructure development. In comparison, there are similar body within Judiciary in other countries, for example, Administrative Office of the United States Courts in US.

Abuse of legal procedure 
Court cases proceed as per rules described in CrPC (Code of Criminal Procedure) and CPC (Code of Civil Procedure). CrPC and CPC have been criticised for being archaic. Adjournments have been used as a tool to delay the proceedings. Lawyers unrestrictedly argue with unrelated oral arguments and submit impractical, long written pleadings to waste time and delay the proceedings.

In contrast, while hearing a case in October 2022, Supreme Court concluded the hearing in only 8 days after it set the time limits for arguments, and allowed no repetitions.

One CrPC rule does not allow criminal cases to proceed if either an accused or a witness is not present before the court. This rule alone accounts for the delay in over 60% of all pending criminal cases, as per NJDG in November 2022.

Corruption and apathy of officials helps in the aiding and abetting abuse of the legal procedure.

State-wise statistics 
Courthall shortfall is calculated as lack of courthalls as percentage of the total sanctioned strength of the judges. A negative percentage means courthalls are in excess. Case clearance rate (CCR) is cases disposed in a year as a percentage of new cases filed in the same year. CCR of less than 100 means case pendency will increase, CCR equal to 100 means case pendency will remain same, CCR of more than 100 means case pendency will decrease. NA: Not Available. (Source: India Justice Report, 2020).

References 

Judiciary of India
Law of India
Supreme Court of India
High Courts of India
District Courts of India